The 1st Alabama Infantry Regiment was a Confederate volunteer infantry unit from the state of Alabama during the American Civil War.

Organization
The 1st Alabama Infantry Regiment completed its organization at Pensacola, Florida about the 1st of April 1, 1861 by the election of regimental officers. The soldiers were from the counties of Tallapoosa, Pike, Lowndes, Wilcox, Talladega, Barbour, and Macon.

History
For a year the regiment staffed the batteries at Pensacola, then moved to Missouri with 1,000 soldiers, where all but a detachment were captured at the Battle of Island Number Ten. The prisoners were exchanged during September, 1862, and it was soon ordered to Port Hudson. Here the unit endured many hardships, and on July 9, 1863 nearly 500 soldiers were captured.

Exchanged and reorganized with 610 effectives, the 1st joined the Army of Tennessee and served in General Quarles' and Shelley's Brigade. It took an active part in the Atlanta and Tennessee Campaigns, and ended the war in North Carolina. Its casualties were high at Peach Tree Creek and were again heavy at Franklin and Nashville. Less than 100 had surrendered by April, 1865. One of their companies, Company D, was also known as Perote Guards.

Field Officers
The field officers were Colonels Henry D. Clayton and I. G. W. Steedman, Lieutenant Colonel Michael B. Locke, and Majors S. L. Knox and Jere N. Williams.

References

 Thrasher, Christopher David. Suffering in the Army of Tennessee: A Social History of the Confederate Army of the Heartland from the Battles for Atlanta to the Retreat from Nashville. 2021.

See also
List of Alabama Civil War Confederate units

Units and formations of the Confederate States Army from Alabama
1861 establishments in Alabama
Military units and formations established in 1861